

Group 3 

All times are local

3